William Joseph "Dard" Hunter (November 29, 1883 – February 20, 1966) was an American authority on printing, paper, and papermaking, especially by hand, using sixteenth century tools and techniques. He is known for, among other things, the production of two hundred copies of his book Old Papermaking, for which he prepared all aspects: Hunter wrote the text, designed and cast the type, did the typesetting, handmade the paper, and printed and bound the book. A display at the Smithsonian Institution that appeared with his work  read, "In the entire history of printing, these are the first books to have been made in their entirety by the labors of one man." He also wrote Papermarking by Hand in America (1950), a similar but even larger undertaking.

Active in the Arts and Crafts movement, Hunter created and championed many other types of handmade arts and crafts, publishing his own guides, such as Things You Can Make. He experimented with pottery, jewelry, stained glass windows, and furniture. He also founded a correspondence school, the Dard Hunter School of Handicrafts.

Biography

Hunter was born and raised in Steubenville, Ohio, where his father published a gazette and ran a printery. From 1900 to 1903 he attended The Ohio State University. He began his career in East Aurora, New York, with a job at Roycroft, the Arts and Crafts company of Elbert Hubbard. In 1908, Dard married Edith Cornell, a pianist he met at Roycroft, and the couple honeymooned in Vienna, a location inspired by Hunter's interest in Josef Hoffmann. Hunter returned to Europe to study papermaking in Italy, and was graduated from Vienna's Royal-Imperial Graphic Teaching and Experimental Institute (K. K. Graphische Lehr und Versuchsanstalt).

The couple went to London in 1911, where he worked as a commercial designer with Norfolk Studios. An exhibit at the London Science Museum provoked his interest in papermaking. In his exploration of primitive and early papermaking, he would travel to East Asia and Pacific locales such as Samoa, Tonga, and Fiji. 

In 1912, they returned to the United States, and Hunter bought and moved into the Gomez Mill House near Marlboro, New York. He built a small papermill there, and crafted his first books on papermaking. Handmade paper was not being produced in America at the time; it had to be purchased from Europe. His English papermaking appliances were three centuries old, and were operated by a wooden water wheel. Over forty-six years, he wrote twenty books about papermaking, eight of which were hand-printed.

In 1919, the Hunter family returned to Ohio and purchased the 1852 "Mountain House" in Chillicothe, which had been built for German winemakers. Hunter used a wing joined to the house for his letterpress printing studio, named Mountain House Press, where he produced eight handmade books, authored twenty books on the topic of papermaking, and was an active publisher between 1922 and 1956. In 1958 he published his autobiography, My Life with Paper.

The year 1930 saw production start in a commercial one-vat mill, in a former iron foundry on the Salmon Fells Kill in Lime Rock, Connecticut, he had purchased and started transforming in 1928. It represented an expenditure, all told, of close to $35,000 dollars, about $ 488,000 USD in 2017 value. Although operating until 1933, it was a financial failure.

Hunter opened the Dard Hunter Paper Museum at the Massachusetts Institute of Technology in 1939, which he considered his greatest accomplishment. It was moved to the Institute of Paper Chemistry in Appleton, Wisconsin, in 1954. The Robert C. Williams Paper Museum now comprises most of the collection of the Institute of Paper Science and Technology, on the campus of the Georgia Institute of Technology in Atlanta.

Death and legacy
Hunter died on February 20, 1966, at Chillicothe, Ohio, he was survived by two sons. His wife had died in 1951. Hunter is buried in Grandview Cemetery, Chillicothe, Ross County, Ohio.

Members of his family maintain Dard Hunter Studios at the historic Mountain House, which are open to the public by appointment. The studio provides an online library. In addition to books written during his lifetime, Dard Hunter & Son is a tribute to the work of Hunter. The 1998 book was selected and exhibited in the New York Public Library's 2003–2004 exhibition Ninety from the Nineties.

To promote and continue the tradition of hand papermaking and book arts, Friends of Dard Hunter was established in 1981.

Hunter's books on papermaking were inspirational to papermaker Douglass Morse Howell.

References

Further reading

External links

 Elbert Hubbard, Dard Hunter and the Roycroft Workshops
 Dard Hunter Studios
 Friends of Dard Hunter, a non-profit organization
 
 The Harrison Elliott Collection at the Library of Congress has the sample collection of 300 early American papers and the correspondence and memorabilia of Dard Hunter, an authority on the history of paper.
 Dard Hunter collection at the Mortimer Rare Book Collection, Smith College Special Collections

AIGA medalists
American artisans
Papermakers
Arts and Crafts movement
People from Steubenville, Ohio
People from Chillicothe, Ohio
1883 births
1966 deaths
People from Marlboro, New York